Garfield Reid (born 14 January 1981) is a Jamaican football defender.

Youth/high school career 

Reid played the DaCosta Cup competition for Charlemont High School in Jamaica and also played youth football for Rivoli United F.C.

Career 
The wingback currently plays for the top-flight Jamaica National Premier League side Benfica F.C. but has also played for Waterhouse F.C. and Rivoli United F.C. He was the inaugural Jamaican in the Norwegian league when he signed on loan for Hamarkameratene in July 2004.

International 
He made his debut for the Reggae Boyz in 2004 against Uruguay and, up to November 2006, earned a total of 26 caps, scoring no goals.

Garfield Reid is a wing-back/midfielder who got his first call-up to the Jamaica national team under technical director Carl Brown, where he made his debut in an international friendly between Jamaica and Uruguay on Wednesday, 18 February 2004. Reid's call came after playing for the national U-23 team in Olympic Qualifying.

External links

1981 births
Living people
Jamaican footballers
Jamaican expatriate footballers
Hamarkameratene players
Jamaica international footballers
Waterhouse F.C. players
Expatriate footballers in Norway
Rivoli United F.C. players
2005 CONCACAF Gold Cup players
Association football defenders